Sickla is a retail park and shopping district in Nacka, Sweden.

Sickla may also refer to:

Sicklasjön, a lake in Stockholm and Nacka, Sweden
Sicklaön, a peninsula in Stockholm and Nacka, Sweden
Sickla kanal, a canal in Stockholm and Nacka, Sweden
Sickla udde, a residential area in the district of Hammarby Sjöstad in Stockholm, Sweden

See also
Sicklauddsbron, a pedestrian bridge in the residential district of Hammarby Sjöstad, Sweden
Sickla kanalbro, a motorway bridge in Stockholm, Sweden